The Shanghai Herald was an English-language newspaper published in Shanghai, China.

The editor of the Shanghai Herald and China Critic, Kwei Chung-shu, had graduated from the University of Wisconsin.

Günther Lenhardt, a journalist from Berlin, Germany, established the Herald. He hired two journalists from Vienna, Austria, Ladislaus Frank and Mark Siegelberg, who had previously worked for the Shanghai Jewish Chronicle. Hartmut Walravens, author of German Influence on the Press in China, said that despite the paper's establishment, "the Shanghai Jewish Chronicle remained the leading paper". The Shanghai Herald and the Shanghai Journal formed an affiliation on March 1, 1946. The Herald began publishing a German supplement, called The Shanghai Herald / German Language Supplement.

Content
One regular feature of the Herald was "Der Wochenslat" ("the weekly salad") by Kurt Lewin.

References
 Cornebise, Alfred Enile. The Shanghai Stars and Stripes: Witness to the Transition to Peace, 1945-1946. McFarland, January 18, 2010. , 9780786447565.
 Eber, Irene. Voices from Shanghai: Jewish Exiles in Wartime China. University of Chicago Press, October 1, 2008. , 9780226181660.
 Walravens, Hartmut. "German Influence on the Press in China." - In: Newspapers in International Librarianship: Papers Presented by the Newspaper Section at IFLA General Conferences. Walter de Gruyter, January 1, 2003. , 9783110962796.
Also available at ( (Archive) the website of the Queens Library - This version does not include the footnotes visible in the Walter de Gruyter version
Also available in Walravens, Hartmut and Edmund King. Newspapers in international librarianship: papers presented by the newspapers section at IFLA General Conferences. K.G. Saur, 2003. , 9783598218378.
Yung, Judy. "It is hard to be born a woman but hopeless to be born a Chinese" The Life and Times of Flora Belle Jan." -- in: Edited by Patricia Hart and Karen Weathermon, with Susan Armitage. Women Writing Women: The Frontiers Reader. University of Nebraska Press, April 1, 2006. , 9780803273368.

Notes

English-language newspapers published in China
Newspapers published in Shanghai